Ken Bones (born 11 June 1947) is an English actor. He is a member of the Royal Shakespeare Company.

Career

Theatre
Bones trained at RADA between 1971 and 1973, where he won the Honours Diploma, the Ronson Prize, the Kendal Award, the Poel Prize and John Barton Prize. His first professional stage appearance was as Roy in The Odd Couple at Crewe in January 1974. His other appearances in that season included Wick in Little Malcolm, Vincent Crummles in Nicholas Nickleby and Dr Hennessey in Count Dracula.
 
During 1974 and 1975 Bones was a member of the Prospect Theatre Company, taking part in the company's national tour in such venues as the Edinburgh Festival and London's Roundhouse, playing Gower in Henry IV and Henry V with Timothy Dalton, and the Narrator in the rock musical Pilgrim with Paul Jones and Peter Straker.

Bones joined the Marlowe Theatre in Canterbury in 1976, and with whom he played Ernst Ludwig in Cabaret, Mr Shanks in Habeas Corpus, Trofimov in The Cherry Orchard, Milo Tindal in Sleuth and Curly Delafield in Knuckle. In 1977 he toured with the Mermaid Theatre educational company 'The Molecule Club' teaching science to children. In 1978 Bones played Lucifer in the first modern revival of The Lincoln Mystery Cycle in Lincoln Cathedral.

During 1978 he joined Southern Exchange Theatre Company, which was established by Charles Savage to provide regional theatre for civic theatres without resident repertory companies playing at the Wyvern Theatre in Swindon, the Hexagon in Reading and the Lighthouse in Poole. With this company he played Ramble in Lock Up Your Daughters, Leonard in Time and Time Again, Saul Hodgkin in The Ghost Train, Alec Kooning in Dear Janet Rosenberg.., The Man in Chekov's The Lady with the Little Dog and Bob Cratchit in A Christmas Carol.

In 1979 Bones played the Earl of Warwick in Saint Joan, Eilert Loevborg in Hedda Gabler with Gayle Hunnicutt, and John in Absent Friends. In 1980 he appeared in a national tour of Woyzeck with Foco Novo Theatre Company playing the Drum Major.

His other stage appearance include the Duke in The Revenger's Tragedy and Dr Klein in Her Naked Skin for the National Theatre, and, for the Royal Shakespeare Company he has appeared in 21 plays, including Antony and Cleopatra, The Tempest, Othello, The Duchess of Malfi, Macbeth, The Winter's Tale, Cyrano de Bergerac, Les Liaisons Dangereuses, Tamburlaine, Much Ado About Nothing and King Lear.

In London's West End Bones has appeared in You Never Can Tell, Communicating Doors, Becket, The Resistible Rise of Arturo Ui and Antony and Cleopatra; and for other theatres Design for Living, Relative Values, As You Like It, A Midsummer Night's Dream Doctor Faustus with Ben Kingsley, and Sir Thomas More.

Most recently he played Reverend Brown in Inherit the Wind with Kevin Spacey at the Old Vic.

Film and television 
Bones' first television appearance was in the BBC Jubilee Play "A Day in the Life" by Ray Connolly, in 1977. In 1980 he appeared in an episode of Fox as Kemble. Bones played Sergeant Parkes in an episode of Spearhead (1981), played a small role in Series 3 of the long running TV series, The Bill (1987), Paul Roussillon in Bergerac (1988), and a Superintendent in London's Burning (1988). Also in 1988 Bones played Victorian medium Robert James Lees in ITV's Jack the Ripper starring Michael Caine which was huge ratings success around the world. His first feature film was Bellman and True (1987) directed by Richard Loncraine and starring Bernard Hill. The New York Times film critic said "Mr Bones makes a memorable screen debut as the bullying Gort." In 1995 Bones played Toussant in the film Cutthroat Island, and in 1998 made appearances in Dangerfield and Cold Feet. He played Admiral Bill Wilson in the 1999 film Wing Commander, and in 2001 he played Banquo in a made-for-television film of the Royal Shakespeare Company's Macbeth which starred Antony Sher as Macbeth. The film was the televised version of a stage show which had an enormously successful run in Britain, Japan and the United States.

In 2002 Bones played Keith Burns in an episode of Spooks and in 2003 appeared in Casualty as Robbie. His 2004 roles include Hippasus in the film Troy starring Brad Pitt, Mr Mansell in Heartbeat and Assistant Commissioner Bob Mullen in New Tricks.

During recent years Bones has appeared in Doctors (2007), Holby City (2008 and 2010) and The Bill (1987-2009) as DCI Ted Ackroyd, as well as in the film Perfect Hideout (2008) starring Billy Zane. In 2009, he played Erasmus in Henry VIII: The Mind of a Tyrant, and in 2011 he appeared in the six-part series The Hour. He has also played a character named Sethius in popular CBBC television series Young Dracula.

Ken Bones portrays Lord Halifax, British Foreign Secretary from 1938 to 1940, in 2012's Season 2 of Upstairs Downstairs, the 2010 British television series.

He appeared in the Doctor Who 50th Anniversary Special The Day of the Doctor as The General in 2013, and reprised the role in the Series 9 finale Hell Bent (2015) before passing the role on to T'Nia Miller. Bones played Publican No. 7 in The World's End (2013), and the same year it was announced that he had joined the cast of Atlantis. His most recent film appearance was as an Egyptian scribe in the 2014 epic Exodus: Gods and Kings. In 2016, he appeared in the TV series Medici: Masters of Florence.

In 2017 Bones appeared in the BBC TV series Father Brown episode 5.3 "The Eve of St John" as a warlock, Eugene Bone. He played Cardinal Leto the Papal envoy in Versailles (2018).

Filmography

Film

Television

References

External links

Bones on the National Theatre website

Alumni of RADA
Living people
English male television actors
English male stage actors
English male film actors
Royal Shakespeare Company members
20th-century English male actors
21st-century English male actors
Male actors from Kent
People from Dartford
1947 births